Alfredo Agostinho Espirito Santo (born 18 April 1938) is a former Portuguese professional footballer.

Career statistics

Club

Notes

References

1938 births
Living people
Angolan footballers
Portuguese footballers
Association football forwards
Primeira Liga players
Segunda Divisão players
S.L. Benfica (Luanda) players
S.L. Benfica footballers
S.C. Covilhã players
S.C. Olhanense players
G.D. Fabril players
C.D. Montijo players
People from Benguela Province